The Knight of Shadows: Between Yin and Yang is a 2019 Chinese historical fantasy comedy film directed by Yan Jia (under the pseudonym Vash), written by Liu Bohan and Jian Wen, and starring Jackie Chan, Zhong Chuxi, Ethan Juan, Lin Peng, and Austin Lin. The film was released on 5 February 2019 in China.

Cast
Jackie Chan as Pu Songling
Zhong Chuxi as Nie Xiaoqian
Ethan Juan as Ning Caichen
Lin Peng as Nie Xiaoqian's sister(mirror demon)
Austin Lin as Yan fei
Qiao Shan
Pan Changjiang
Kingdom Yuen
Lance Luu
Jiang Yuan
Jia Haitao

Marketing
A music video for The Knight of Shadows was released on January 27, 2019.

Release
The film was released on 5 February 2019 in China. In the Philippines, the film was released on 6 February 2019 by Star Cinema, timed to coincide with the Lunar New Year, with its premiere held at TriNoma four days prior.

Reception
Douban gave the drama 4.3 out of 10.

Box office
The film earned a total of 123 million yuan in its first 5 days of release.

References

External links

2019 films
Films based on Strange Stories from a Chinese Studio
2010s Mandarin-language films